Sir John Ralph Milbanke Huskisson, 8th Baronet (5 November 1800 - 30 December 1868) was a British diplomat.

He served at Frankfurt, St Petersburg, and Munich before serving as Envoy Extraordinary and Minister Plenipotentiary to the Netherlands  from 1862 until 1867.

Notes

British diplomats
1868 deaths
1800 births
Baronets in the Baronetage of England